Allahqulubağı is a village and municipality in the Zardab Rayon of Azerbaijan. It has a population of 518.

References

Populated places in Zardab District